HMS Hotham (K583)  was a Captain-class frigate of the Buckley class of destroyer escort, originally intended for the United States Navy. Before she was finished in 1944, she was transferred to the Royal Navy under the terms of Lend-Lease, and was in commission from 1944 to 1956, including service during World War II.

Construction and transfer
The still-unnamed ship was laid down as the U.S. Navy destroyer escort DE-574 by Bethlehem-Hingham Shipyard, Inc., in Hingham, Massachusetts, on 5 November 1943. Allocated to the United Kingdom, she received the British name Hotham and was launched on 21 December 1943. She was transferred to the United Kingdom upon completion on 8 February 1944.

Service history

Commissioned into service in the Royal Navy as the frigate HMS Hotham (K583) on 8 February 1944 simultaneously with her transfer, the ship served on escort duty for the rest of World War II.

Unlike the other Captain-class frigates, Hotham was retained by the Royal Navy after the war, and was disarmed and sent to Singapore in 1945 for use as a floating power station, moving later in the year to Hong Kong for use as a station ship. She returned to the United Kingdom in 1947, and in 1948 was at Malta to serve as a floating power station. The Royal Navy later used her for experiments with gas turbine propulsion.

The Royal Navy nominally returned Hotham to the United States Government on 25 April 1952 under the terms of Lend-Lease, but the United States simultaneously transferred her back to the United Kingdom under the terms of the Mutual Defense Assistance Program.

Disposal
The Royal Navy returned Hotham to U.S. custody for the final time on 13 March 1956, and she was sold for scrapping in the Netherlands on 1 November 1956.

References
 

 

Captain-class frigates
Buckley-class destroyer escorts
World War II frigates of the United Kingdom
Ships built in Hingham, Massachusetts
1943 ships